TVN (stylized as tvN) is a South Korean nationwide pay television network owned by CJ E&M, entertainment division of CJ ENM. tvN programming consists of a variety of entertainment content, focused in television series and variety shows. It is available on cable, on satellite through SkyLife, and IPTV platforms in South Korea. Since 2014, the network is headed by Rhee Myung-han. From June 28, 2010, to April 30, 2013, tvN Go was broadcast by renting a channel from Korea DMB.

Logo

Programs

News
 tvN e-News 9 (an entertainment equivalent of KBS News 9 and JTBC Newsroom)

TV series

tvN dramas are exported to various countries in Asia and the Americas. tvN's highest-rated TV series are Crash Landing On You, Reply 1988 and Guardian: The Lonely and Great God. The final episode of Crash Landing On You recorded 21.683% nationwide audience share, the third highest ratings recorded by a Korean cable television drama until that point. It also became the first tvN drama to cross 20% ratings, and was critically acclaimed for its screenplay, direction and performances. Reply 1988 received both critical and audience acclaim, with its finale episode achieved an 18.8% nationwide audience share and making it the highest rated drama in Korean cable television history for the next three years. In addition, Guardian: The Lonely and Great God was also a hit and consistently topped cable television viewership ratings in its time slot. Its final episode recorded an 18.680% nationwide audience share, the second highest ratings of a Korean cable television drama at the time. It received critical acclaim and became a cultural phenomenon in South Korea.

Currently, tvN dramas hold 32 spots of the 50 on the list of highest-rated Korean dramas in cable television.

Entertainment

Sports
Alongside with sporting lineups aired on tvN, tvN SPORTS also launched as a standalone channel in 2022.

Football 
 AFC (2021-2024)
 National teams
 2022 FIFA World Cup qualification (from third round)
 2023 AFC Asian Cup
 2022 AFC Women's Asian Cup
 AFC Junior/Youth Championships
 Men's/boys
 AFC U-23 Championship
 AFC U-19 Championship
 AFC U-16 Championship
 Women's/girls
 AFC U-19 Women's Championship
 AFC U-16 Women's Championship
 AFC Futsal Championships
 AFC Men's Futsal Championship
 AFC U-20 Men's Futsal Championship
 AFC Women's Futsal Championship
 Clubs
 AFC Cup
 AFC Futsal Club Championship
 UEFA Euro 2020 
 Germany: Bundesliga, DFB-Pokal, DFL-Supercup (2021-2024)

Tennis 

 French Open (from 2021)
 Australian Open (from 2022)
 ATP Tour 250 (including Korea Open)
 2022 Korea Open (tennis)

Mixed Martial Arts 

 Ultimate Fighting Championship

Aquatics sports 

 19th FINA World Championships
 2022 FINA World Junior Swimming Championships

Golf 
 CJ Cup (PGA Tour)

Viewership ratings 
The table below lists the top 20 dramas with the highest average audience share ratings (nationwide), corresponding episode with highest rating and the date.

The table below lists the top 20 dramas with the highest nationwide viewers (in millions), corresponding episode with highest nationwide viewers and the date.

Foreign partners

See also
 List of programs broadcast by tvN (South Korean TV channel)

Footnotes

Notes

References

External links
  

TVN
CJ E&M channels
Television channels in South Korea
Korean-language television stations
Television channels and stations established in 2006
2006 establishments in South Korea